I'm Standing Here is an early EP album by Japanese rock band Asian Kung-Fu Generation, released on November 30, 2001.

Background
Including their split mini-album with rock musician Caramelman, I'm Standing Here was the third and last independent EP the band recorded before releasing their major-label debut EP, Hōkai Amplifier. In contrast to their previous indie releases, the band composed the songs featured on the mini-album mostly with Japanese lyrics. While the mini-album retained only one single, "Konayuki," it came to receive significant airplay on indie radio stations and a redone version was later included within the band's debut EP. Additionally, "E" would later be redone for their first full-length album, Kimi Tsunagi Five M, while "Hold Me Tight" would be re-recorded for the single, "Kimi no Machi Made," and included on their compilation album, Feedback File.

Track listing
"Hold Me Tight" – 4:14
"Need Your Love" – 2:02
 – 3:47
 – 3:14
"I'm Standing Here" – 4:18
"E" – 4:35

Personnel
Masafumi Gotō – lead vocals, guitar, lyrics
Kensuke Kita – lead guitar, background vocals
Takahiro Yamada –  bass, background vocals
Kiyoshi Ijichi – drums

References 

Asian Kung-Fu Generation EPs
2001 EPs
Japanese-language EPs